New Hampshire Route 236 (abbreviated NH 236) is a  east–west state highway located entirely in the city of Somersworth, New Hampshire. Its western terminus is at an intersection with New Hampshire Route 108 west of downtown. Its eastern terminus is at the Maine state line, where the highway crosses the border into Berwick, Maine overlapped with New Hampshire Route 9.  The roadway continues into Maine as Maine State Route 9.

Some older signs in downtown Somersworth show NH 236 as a north–south highway, but more recent signage is indicative of its east–west orientation.

Route description
NH 236 begins at NH 108 in western Somersworth and initially travels due east. Upon reaching downtown, the highway turns to the north and intersects NH 9 (High Street). NH 236 joins NH 9 and the two routes continue through the downtown area, before crossing the Salmon Falls River into Berwick, Maine just  to the north. 

NH 236 ends, but its implied continuation, Maine State Route 236, begins less than  past the state line, splitting from SR 9 in the town center of Berwick. No concurrency is signed on the Maine side, resulting in a short gap between the two highways signed solely as SR 9.

NH 236 runs through the western side of Somersworth, and is known as West High Street.  The section cosigned with NH 9 downtown runs along High and Market Streets.

Junction list

References

External links

 New Hampshire State Route 236 on Flickr

236
Transportation in Strafford County, New Hampshire